The Assistant Chief of the Naval Staff (U boat and Trade) was a senior British Royal Navy appointment. The post holder was part of the Admiralty Naval Staff and member of the Board of Admiralty from 1940 to 1945.

History
First created in July 1940 as a new post as part of the redefining of responsibilities of the Assistant Chief of Naval Staff the post holder was a part of the Admiralty Naval Staff and member of the Board of Admiralty. The post holder was responsible for supervising the directors of a number of naval staff divisions specifically the Minesweeping Division and the Trade Division until  1945.

Office Holders
Included:
 Vice-Admiral Henry Ruthven Moore, — (July 1940–October 1941)
 Vice-Admiral Edward L. S. King,	— (October 1941–December 1942)
 Rear-Admiral John H. Edelsten, — (December 1942–October 1944)
 Rear-Admiral Rear-Admiral John G. L. Dundas, — (October 1944–March 1945)
 Rear-Admiral Rear-Admiral John M. Mansfield, — (March–? 1945)

References

A